Javier 'Javi' Álamo Cruz (born 18 August 1988) is a Spanish professional footballer who plays as a winger for SD Ejea.

Football career
Born in Gáldar, Las Palmas, Álamo spent his first four seasons as a senior in the third division, with local Universidad de Las Palmas CF (two years), RCD Mallorca B and Real Unión. In the 2010–11 campaign he scored his first goals as a professional, but the Basques failed to return to the second level.

Álamo joined Recreativo de Huelva for 2011–12. He made his official debut for his new club on 27 August 2011, playing the full 90 minutes in a 0–1 away loss against Deportivo de La Coruña.

In late July 2012, Álamo signed a four-year contract with Real Zaragoza in La Liga. He first appeared in the competition on 16 September, coming on as a late substitute in a 0–2 defeat at Real Sociedad.

After suffering relegation in his first season, Álamo became a regular starter for the Aragonese side. On 10 August 2015, he was loaned to fellow second tier club Girona FC in a season-long deal.

On 31 August 2016, free agent Álamo signed a one-year contract with CA Osasuna, recently promoted to the top flight. The following 17 January, after being rarely used in Navarre, he was released by mutual consent and joined UD Almería hours later.

On 5 January 2019, after six months without a club, Álamo signed for Extremadura UD still in the second division.

References

External links

1988 births
Living people
People from Gran Canaria
Sportspeople from the Province of Las Palmas
Spanish footballers
Footballers from the Canary Islands
Association football wingers
La Liga players
Segunda División players
Segunda División B players
Universidad de Las Palmas CF footballers
Cultural Leonesa footballers
RCD Mallorca B players
Real Unión footballers
Recreativo de Huelva players
Real Zaragoza players
Girona FC players
CA Osasuna players
UD Almería players
Extremadura UD footballers
UD Logroñés players
Barakaldo CF footballers
SD Ejea players